kankai is a Hindu holi place but it may also refer to:
 Kankai, a Hindu holi place
 Kankai Municipality, a Municipality in Nepal
 Kankai River, a river